The 2019 Catalan motorcycle Grand Prix was the seventh round of the 2019 MotoGP season. It was held at the Circuit de Barcelona-Catalunya in Montmeló on 16 June 2019.

Classification

MotoGP

Moto2

Moto3

Championship standings after the race

MotoGP

Moto2

Moto3

Notes

References

External links

Catalan
Catalan motorcycle Grand Prix
Catalan motorcycle Grand Prix
Catalan